Francis Rigby (born 21 March 1973 in Stockport, England) is an Australian retired ice dancer. With his wife Portia Duval-Rigby, he is a two time Australian Champion. They were married in 1997. The Rigbys were coached by Helen Ma and Svetlana Liapina. Their highest placement at an ISU Championship was 12th at the 1999 and 2001 Four Continents Championships.

Rigby previously skated with Krystal Lee. He is an economist.

Competitive highlights
(with Rigby)

References

External links
 Tracings.net profile

Australian male ice dancers
1973 births
Living people